Vishwendra Paswan is a Nepalese politician and human rights activist. He was the chairman of the Dalit Janajati Party. He is the president of the Bahujan Shakti Party and an avowed Ambedkarite. He was a member of the Nepalese Constituent Assembly. He served as Minister of Science, Technology, Environment and Population, Govt. of Nepal. He belongs to Dalit community, and follows Buddhism.

Vishwendra Paswan is known as the "Ambedkar of Nepal".

In the 2008 Constituent Assembly election, the Dalit Janajati Party won 1 seat through the Proportional Representation vote. The party selected Paswan as its representative in the assembly.

References

Living people
Dalit Janajati Party politicians
Year of birth missing (living people)
Members of the 2nd Nepalese Constituent Assembly
Members of the 1st Nepalese Constituent Assembly

Nepalese Buddhists
Dalit politicians